The Eastern Suburbs Rugby Union Football Club is a team in the Intrust Super Shute Shield, the premier club rugby union football competition in New South Wales.

The club is based in Rose Bay in the eastern suburbs of Sydney, and was founded in 1900.

Easts have won a total of 77 NSWRU premiership titles or shields across all grades, as well as 9 club championships.

Club information 
 Club Colors: Navy Blue, White and Red
 Home stadium: Woollahra Oval (1949-), Waverley Oval (1936–1948), Rushcutters Bay Oval (1900–1935), Centennial Park Oval* (2018)
      *Centennial Park Oval was used as the club's home ground, Woollahra Oval had complications with the installation of a synthetic turf, which was then relaid.
Coaches:
 Head Coach: Simon Kneebone 
 Colts Head Coach: Dan England

 Club history 

Eastern Suburbs District Rugby Union Football Club was formed at a meeting at the Paddington Town Hall on Thursday, 22 March 1900. In an assembly presided over by the mayor and aldermen of Woollahra Council, 200 Eastern Suburbs residents turned out to hear Colonel J.C. Nield put forward a case for the birth of a local rugby club. The sports journalist Jack Davis motioned for the formation of the club and, from that point forth, Eastern Suburbs Rugby Union Football club came into being. Easts Rugby is the oldest district rugby union club in Australia.

Since then, Easts Rugby has seen a lot of great players. The first ever try-scorer for Eastern Suburbs in a first grade premiership match was H.D. Thompson, who scored a try on 19 May 1900 playing Glebe at the Sydney Cricket Ground. That same day, Leo Finn made the conversion and became Easts first goal scorer. That year, Easts Rugby was honoured to have test forward A.J. (Tiger) Kelly become its first NSW representative, when he helped lead NSW to victory over QLD 11–9 in Sydney on 21 July 1900. However, it was not until 1903, when J.W. Maund was named in the Australian side, that Easts saw its first Wallaby.

As the years moved on, Easts Rugby saw success on many occasions. The club was helped along by a raft of talent that included H.H. (Dally) Messenger, G.C. (Wakka) Walker, sports star Harald Baker, and Victorian Cross winner Bede Kenny. Easts also had a notable backline when Stanley R. Rowley – Australia's first Olympic sprint medalist – joined the team in the early 1900s. Other noted players included Dr Alex Ross, Englishman Ed Slater, Robert Westfield, Colin J. Sefton, Wallaby Murray Tate, reputed goal-kicker John Cox, World Cup winners Tony Daly and Jason Little, the world's best number 8 in his era Tim Gavin and H.R. (Perc) Newton who played a record 264 grade games for Easts.

In all, Easts Rugby has won a total of 79 premiership titles or shields across Grade and Colts from 1900 to 2013. Along with this, they have won 9 club championships and continue to be a breeding ground for superstars of the future.

A women's team was first established in 1994. Team captains were Sarah Roxburgh and Amy Copeland.

 Honours FIRST DIVISION 1st Grade Premiers (Shute Shield since 1923): 1903, 1913, 1921, 1931, 1941, 1944, 1946, 1947, 1969
 ES Marks Minor Premierships: 1953, 1969, 1970, 2000SECOND DIVISION'''
 1st Grade Premiers (Colin Lawson Memorial Trophy): 1981, 1984

Recent titles in other grades:
 2022,2018,2009 Colin Caird Shield
 2022,2010 Henderson Cup
 2019 Shell Trophy
 2022,2019,2018,2013 Bill Simpson Shield

Players of note 

Adam Fullgrabe
Tom Bowman
Mark Bakewell
Ryan Cross
Tony Daly
Huia Edmonds
Scott Van Houten
Ted Fahey
Tim Gavin
Andrew Heath
Matt Hodgson
Neill Hunt
Jason Little

Malcolm McArthur
Archer Holz
Keith McLellan
Dally Messenger
Ed Slater
Tiaan Strauss
Fred Thompson
John Welborn
Brendan McKibbin
Matt To'omua 
Jack Maddocks 
Kotaro Matsushima  (2015)

Nearby Clubs 
Woollahra Colleagues RFC
Waverley Rugby Club

External links 
Easts Rugby Club, Sydney

Rugby union teams in Sydney
Rugby clubs established in 1900
1900 establishments in Australia
Rose Bay, New South Wales